The Northern Belle is a luxury train that operates day and weekend journeys around Britain from many different departure points. The train is named to recall the Belle trains of the 1930s, such as the weekly Northern Belle land cruise; operated by the London & North Eastern Railway every June from 1933 to 1939.

The carriages had been restored by the Venice-Simplon Orient Express which became Belmond Limited in 2014.

Services
Northern Belle visits places of interest throughout Britain such as castles, country houses, cities, sporting occasions and events including the Hampton Court Palace Flower Show and Royal Edinburgh Military Tattoo. There are also weekend journeys to destinations including Inverness, with overnight hotel accommodation, and non-stop round trips with dining on board. 

Northern Belle operates mainly throughout northern Britain, with destinations ranging from Edinburgh, Cardiff, Cheltenham, Chester and Harrogate to as far south as London and Bristol.

Carriages
The Northern Belle consists of 13 coaches: 7 converted Mark 2 coaches as crew and dining carriages, 2 Mark 3 staff sleepers, 2 Mark 1 service and kitchen cars, a Mark 1 baggage car, and a Mark 1 Pullman parlour car Duart, which was added to the train in 2012. The carriages were re-engineered by LNWR at Crewe, in the style of Pullman coaches. 

The dining car interiors are decorated with artwork, mosaics and wooden panels. Some of the marquetry was created by A Dunn and Son, a family firm that dates from 1895 and which created panels for carriages that ran on the historic Northern Belle services.

Locomotives and operation
The Northern Belle was originally hauled by English, Welsh and Scottish Railway (EWS) s. EWS was bought by DB Schenker in 2007 and then in 2011, Direct Rail Services (DRS) started a five-year contract to operate the service with s and later s. In 2011, preparation of the carriages moved from Arriva TrainCare to the Severn Valley Railway.

The Northern Belle was sold to West Coast Railways proprietor David Smith and businessman David Pitts in November 2017. Since April 2018 the train has been hauled by West Coast Railways' (WCR) class 57s. Carriage preparation was transferred to Carnforth at the same time.

References

External links

Official site
The Ultimate Guide to the Northern Belle

Luxury trains
Named passenger trains of the United Kingdom
Railway services introduced in 2000
2000 establishments in England